Celestine  is a given name and a surname.

People

Given name
 Pope Celestine I (died 432)
 Pope Celestine II (died 1144)
 Pope Celestine III (c. 1106–1198)
 Pope Celestine IV (died 1241)
 Pope Celestine V (1215–1296)
 Antipope Celestine II, antipope for one day: December 16, 1124
 Celestine Babayaro (born 1978), Nigerian former footballer
 Celestine Damiano (1911-1967), American Roman Catholic prelate
 Célestine Galli-Marié (1840–1905), French mezzo-soprano who created the title role in the opera Carmen
 Célestine Guynemer de la Hailandière (1798–1882), French-born American Roman Catholic prelate
 Celestine Tate Harrington (1956–1998), quadriplegic street musician known for playing the keyboard with her lips and tongue
 Célestine N'Drin (born 1963), Côte d'Ivoire runner who specialized in the 400 and 800 metres
 Celestine Omehia (born 1959), Nigerian politician
 Celestine Sibley (1914–1999), Southern American author, journalist, and syndicated columnist
 Celestine Edwards, political activist 
 Celestine Lazarus (born 1992), Nigerian professional footballer
 Celestine Ukwu (1940-1977), Igbo highlife musician
 Celestine Babayaro (born 1978), Nigerian former footballer
 Célestine Hitiura Vaite (born 1966), French-Polynesian writer
 Célestine “Tina” Knowles (born 1954), American businesswoman and fashion designer and the mother of Beyonce Knowles and Solange Knowles
 Celestine Cruz Gonzaga-Soriano (born 1984), better known as Toni Gonzaga, Filipina singer
 Celestine Onwuliri (1952-2012), university professor of Parasitology

Surname
 Enzo Célestine (born 1997), French professional footballer
 James Celestine (born 1973), Bermudian cricketer

Fictional characters
 Célestine (Mirbeau), main character and narrator of the French novel The Diary of a Chambermaid, by Octave Mirbeau
 Celestine Tavernier, on the BBC soap opera EastEnders
 Celestine (comics), in the Image Comics universe
 Celestine Groht, a fictional character in the anime Gundam SEED DESTINY

Other uses
 Celestines, a branch of the Benedictine Order of monks
 Celestine Nuns, another name for nuns of the Order of the Most Holy Annunciation 
 Celestine (mineral), a mineral, also known as celestite, found worldwide
 Celestine, Indiana, a town in Dubois County, Indiana
 La Celestine (Carlota Valdivia), a 1904 painting from Picasso's Blue Period
 Celestine (album) by Filipino singer Toni Gonzaga, released in May, 2014
 Ernest and Celestine, animated French film, 2012

See also
 Celestin, a character in the anime film Ah! My Goddess: The Movie
 Celestina (disambiguation)
 Celestino
 Celandine (disambiguation)